Andrew Gray is an American politician. He serves as a Democratic member for the 20th district of the Alaska House of Representatives.

Life and career 
Gray was a physician assistant.

In 2022, Gray defeated Scott Kohlhaas, Jordan Harary and Paul Bauer in the general election for the 20th district of the Alaska House of Representatives, winning 54 percent of the votes. He succeeded Zack Fields. He assumed office in 2023.

References 

Living people
Year of birth missing (living people)
Place of birth missing (living people)
Democratic Party members of the Alaska House of Representatives
21st-century American politicians